Epipogiinae is an orchid subtribe in the tribe Nervilieae.

The genus Silvorchis was previously included but is now placed in the subtribe Orchidinae.

See also
 Taxonomy of the Orchidaceae

References

External links

 
Orchid subtribes